The 2023 Northern Ontario Men's Provincial Curling Championship, also known as the Unibet Northern Ontario Tankard, the men's provincial curling championship for Northern Ontario, was held from January 25 to 29 at the Kenora Recreation Centre in Kenora, Ontario. The winning Tanner Horgan rink will represent Northern Ontario at the 2023 Tim Hortons Brier, Canada's national men's curling championship, at the Budweiser Gardens in London, Ontario. The event is being held in conjunction with the 2023 Northern Ontario Scotties Tournament of Hearts, the provincial women's curling championship.

Teams
The teams are listed as follows:

Knockout brackets

Source:

A event

B event

C Event

Knockout Results
All draws are listed in Central Time (UTC−06:00).

Draw 1
Wednesday, January 25, 9:30 am

Draw 2
Wednesday, January 25, 2:30 pm

Draw 3
Wednesday, January 25, 7:30 pm

Draw 4
Thursday, January 26, 9:30 am

Draw 5
Thursday, January 26, 2:30 pm

Draw 6
Thursday, January 26, 7:30 pm

Draw 7
Friday, January 27, 9:30 am

Draw 8
Friday, January 27, 2:30 pm

Draw 9
Friday, January 27, 7:30 pm

Draw 10
Saturday, January 28, 9:30 am

Draw 11
Saturday, January 28, 2:30 pm

Playoffs

A vs. B
Saturday, January 28, 7:30 pm

C1 vs. C2
Saturday, January 28, 7:30 pm

Semifinal
Sunday, January 29, 9:30 am

Final
Sunday, January 29, 6:00 pm

References

External links

2023 Tim Hortons Brier
Sport in Kenora
Curling in Northern Ontario
2023 in Ontario
January 2023 sports events in Canada
Curling competitions in Ontario